Adam Conover (born March 2) is an American comedian, writer, voice actor, and television host. He created and hosted the half-hour truTV show Adam Ruins Everything, based on the CollegeHumor series of the same name. He was also the host of the American version of The Crystal Maze on Nickelodeon. In 2022, Conover's limited series The G Word with Adam Conover debuted on Netflix.

Early life 

Adam Conover was born in Smithtown, New York, and grew up in Wading River.

His parents are David O. Conover, a marine biologist, and Margaret Conover (née Howard), a botanist.

His younger sister is Emily Conover, a science reporter who holds a PhD in particle physics.

His parents' and sibling's degrees have led Adam to describe himself as "the only member of the family without a Ph.D."

In 2000, he graduated from Shoreham-Wading River High School, where he became interested in the performing arts. As a teenager, he was part of a band called Bocoach. He then attended Bard College, where, in 2002, he became an active member of the sketch comedy group Olde English. In 2004, he earned a bachelor's degree in philosophy from Bard College.

Career 
In 2012, Conover began working as a sketch comedy writer and performer for the comedy website and YouTube channel CollegeHumor, where he eventually created the web series that would go on to become Adam Ruins Everything on TruTV. The first episode of the TruTV show, which aims to reveal untold truths and to dispel common misconceptions, premiered on September 29, 2015. Conover has said his character in the show is a comedic interpretation of the person he worries he once was and/or is. As he told The New York Observer, "It’s the reaction I’ve gotten my whole life: that I learn something and try to tell people in conversation, but when I tell them, they are annoyed."

In March 2016, he was asked to speak at a marketing conference on the subject of millennials; the talk he gave was entitled "Millennials Don't Exist". In 2018, Conover was the headliner of the first night of the annual CSICon conference for skeptics. On August 17, 2018, Conover was a guest on Real Time with Bill Maher. On April 17, 2019, Conover was a guest on The Joe Rogan Experience.

He has voiced several characters in the Netflix animated series BoJack Horseman, including A Ryan Seacrest-Type, one of the Paparazzi Birds, and Bradley Hitler-Smith. In 2019, he voiced the character of "Big_Hairy_Stallion_69" on the Netflix series Tuca and Bertie, and created the new Earwolf podcast Factually!

Since 2020, Conover has also acted as the host of an American adaptation of the family game show The Crystal Maze for Nickelodeon.

In November 2020, Conover had a cameo appearance as his character from Adam Ruins Everything in The Eric Andre Show. He appeared in the show's opening sequence and was beaten to death then shot by Eric Andre.

In December 2020, Conover announced that Adam Ruins Everything was no longer in production and that he was planning a new Netflix series about the federal government called The G Word with Adam Conover. The show premiered on Netflix on May 19, 2022.

Filmography

Television

Personal life 
Conover was once a roommate of BoJack Horseman creator Raphael Bob-Waksberg in New York City, who also introduced him to his girlfriend, illustrator Lisa Hanawalt.

Conover quit drinking in early 2018.

Activism 
Conover has been an outspoken supporter of Nithya Raman, who challenged and beat David Ryu for the Los Angeles City Council. As an activist for Housing First policies, Conover performed stand-up to fundraise for the campaign and canvassed in support of Raman. Conover serves on the board of the Writers Guild of America West.

References

External links 

 
 
 

American male voice actors
American stand-up comedians
American television hosts
Bard College alumni
CollegeHumor people
Comedians from New York (state)
Living people
People from Wading River, New York
21st-century American comedians
Year of birth missing (living people)